Wong Kwan Hang (born 19 May 1992) is a Hong Kong boccia player. 

At the 2020 Summer Paralympics, he won the silver medal in the pairs event alongside Leung Yuk Wing and Vivian Lau Wai-yan.

References 

1992 births
Living people
Paralympic medalists in boccia
Boccia players at the 2016 Summer Paralympics
Boccia players at the 2020 Summer Paralympics
Medalists at the 2020 Summer Paralympics
Paralympic silver medalists for Hong Kong
Paralympic boccia players of Hong Kong